Aleena Shaji, better known by her stage name Ivana, is an Indian actress who predominantly works in Tamil and Malayalam-language films.

Career
Aleena began her career as a child actress in the Malayalam film industry through supporting role in Masters (2012), before working on Rani Padmini (2015), three years later. Aleena then portrayed a pivotal role in Anuraga Karikkin Vellam (2016) as the daughter of the lead character. Director Bala had spotted a news article about Anuraga Karikkun Vellam online and subsequently chose to cast Aleena in his Tamil film, Naachiyaar (2018), which also had Jyothika and G. V. Prakash Kumar in pivotal roles. Bala requested that she should use a stage name which would be easier to pronounce for Tamil audiences, and with the assistance of her cousin, she finalised the name Ivana. In order to prepare for her role, she undertook Tamil classes, while her co-actors assisted and gave her tips when filming certain scenes. Portraying Arasi, a young, innocent girl, Ivana won rave reviews for her performance. Sify.com noted "with and a pretty fresh face and large expressive eyes, Ivana makes a wholly believable Arasi". Likewise, critics from The New Indian Express noted that Ivana makes "an impressive debut", while India Today's reviewer stated that Ivana gives a "splendid performance" and her "expressions are pleasing and pretty convincing".

Filmography

Awards and nominations

References

External links 

Living people
Indian film actresses
Actresses in Tamil cinema
Actresses in Malayalam cinema
21st-century Indian actresses
Year of birth missing (living people)